Entença is a station on line 5 of the Barcelona Metro.

The station is located underneath Carrer Rosselló in the Eixample, between Carrer Entença and Carrer Rocafort. It was opened in 1969.

The side-platform station has a ticket hall on either end, the eastern one with one access at Carrer Rocafort, the western one with one access at Entença.

Services

External links

 Entença at Trenscat.com

Railway stations in Spain opened in 1969
Barcelona Metro line 5 stations
Transport in Eixample